"Ticket Outta Loserville" is the lead single from British pop punk band Son of Dork's debut and only studio album,Welcome to Loserville (2005). Released on 7 November 2005, two weeks prior to the album, the single peaked at number three on the UK Singles Chart as well as reaching number 15 in Ireland.

Music video
The video for the song was directed by Ulf Buddensieck. The band is performing in a garage, and the story is each of them going out with a girl and being popular. It then ends up with the girl being seen with one of the school football team players. There is also an adult version, while they are singing the final chorus, which sees a woman with no bra on underneath some pom-poms. You see the girl then taking away the pom-poms, exposing her breasts.

Track listings
UK CD1
 "Ticket Outta Loserville"
 "I Want You Back"

UK CD2
 "Ticket Outta Loserville"
 Interview with Son of Dork
 "Slacker"
 "Ticket Outta Loserville" (video—exclusive live version)
 "Ticket Outta Loserville" (U-MYX format)

UK DVD single
 "Ticket Outta Loserville" (audio)
 "Ticket Outta Loserville" (the video)
 Son of Dork home movie
 "Escape from Loserville" (the game)

Charts

Weekly charts

Year-end charts

References

Son of Dork songs
2005 debut singles
2005 songs
Mercury Records singles
Song recordings produced by Gil Norton
Songs written by James Bourne